Freya Mathews  is an Australian environmental philosopher whose main work has been in the areas of ecological metaphysics and panpsychism. Her current special interests are in ecological civilization; indigenous (Australian and Chinese) perspectives on "sustainability" and how these perspectives may be adapted to the context of contemporary global society; panpsychism and critique of the metaphysics of modernity; and wildlife ethics and rewilding in the context of the Anthropocene.

Mathews has been teaching in Australian universities since 1979. She currently holds the post of Adjunct Professor of Environmental Philosophy at La Trobe University. Mathews is the author of several books and over seventy articles on ecological philosophy, metaphysics, epistemology, ethics, and politics. In addition to her research activities she manages a private biodiversity reserve in northern Victoria, Australia.  She is a fellow of the Australian Academy of the Humanities.

Works 
Mathews's philosophy features a holistic approach to environmental ethics with a metaphysical basis. Particularly, she draws from Baruch Spinoza's notion of "ethic of interconnectedness", which treats the features of the natural world as attributes of the same underlying substance.  Her advocacy of ontopoetics, which she described as a meaningful communicative exchanges between self and the world, is an aspect to this philosophical view. She also promotes a kind of ecocentrism to address and sustain inconvenient, and time-consuming conservation practice.

Selected publications
 The Ecological Self, Routledge, London, 1991. Reissued 1993; paperback 1994
 For Love of Matter: A Contemporary Panpsychism, SUNY Press, Albany, 2003
 Journey to the Source of the Merri, Ginninderra Press, Canberra, 2003
 Reinhabiting Reality: Towards a Recovery of Culture, SUNY Press, Albany, 2005
 Ardea: a Philosophical Novella, Punctum Books, New York, 2016
 Without Animals Life is not Worth Living, Ginninderra Press, Adelaide, 2016

See also
 Deep Ecology
 Panpsychism
 Sigurd Zienau

References

Further reading
External links
 Freya Mathews' homepage
 Kate Rigby (2006), "Minding (about) Matter: On the Eros and Anguish of Earthly Encounter." A review essay engaging with Freya Mathews' two recent titles: For Love of Matter: A Contemporary Panpsychism and Reinhabiting Reality: Towards a Recovery of Culture in Australian Humanities Review, Volume 28.
 Book Review of Reinhabiting Reality Trumpeter, Vol 24, No 3 (2008)
 Book review of For Love of Matter 
 Soren Brier, "Trust in the Order of Things", review of The Ecological Self, Systems Practice, 9,4, 1996 pp 377–385
 Bonnett, M 2002, 'Education for sustainability as a frame of mind' Environmental Education Research, vol 8, no. 1, pp. 9–20
 Book review of The Ecological Self on the Panexperientialim blog
 A post on the Guide to Reality blog about The Ecological Self
 Entry on Freya Mathews in Julie Newman (ed), Green Ethics and Philosophy: an A – Z Guide, Sage, 2011
Books
B. Baxter, Ecologism: An Introduction (Georgetown University Press, 2000), pp 16–33, 58-79.
E. de Jonge, Spinoza and Deep Ecology: Challenging Traditional Approaches to Environmentalism (Routledge, 2016), Ch. 3.
J. Franklin, Corrupting the Youth: A History of Philosophy in Australia (Macleay Press, 2003), ch. 13.

Year of birth missing (living people)
Living people
Australian women philosophers
21st-century Australian philosophers
Australian environmentalists
Australian women environmentalists
Epistemologists
20th-century Australian philosophers
Panpsychism
20th-century Australian women
Fellows of the Australian Academy of the Humanities